Asokamala is a 1947 Sri Lankan historical film co-directed by Shanthi Kumar and T. R. Goppu and produced by Sir Chittampalam A. Gardiner. It was the second film made in the Sinhalese language and the first by a Sinhalese director. It also was the first film that W. D. Albert Perera (later known as Amaradeva), Mohideen Baig and Mohammed Ghouse contributed to. The melodies of the songs of 'Asokamala' were original ones devised by Mohamed Ghouse- a departure from what was to be the copying of Indian melodies in the time to come.

Plot
Prince-heir Saliya gives up the throne to marry the commoner Asokamala.

Cast
 Shanthi Kumar as Saliya 'Kumara'
 Evelyn Dimbulana as Asoka Mala
 Michael Sannas Liyanage as Senadhipathi Vipula 'Senevi'
 Herbie Seneviratne as Sena 'Kumara'
 Don Edward as Ran Kira 'Appucha'
 Austin Abeysekara as Abhaya 'Appa'
 Michael Rodrigo as Maharaja Dutugemunu
 Srimathi Karunadevi as Chitra
 W. D. Amaradeva as Swami
 Sunil Premadasa as Vinitha
 Peter Siriwardena as Mahadavan

Production
This movie was shot at Central Studios in Coimbatore, India as was many other Sinhala films that were shot in Madras Presidency in center like Madras, Coimbatore and Salem.

Songs
 "Bhave beetha hera" – W. D. Albert Perera (Pandith W.D. Amaradewa)
 "Prithi Prithi" – Bhagyarathi and chorus (lyrics by D.T. Fernando)
 "Ho Premey Babaley" – Mohideen Baig and Bhagyarathi
 "Shantha Mey Rathriye" – Bhagyarathi (Lyrics by D.T. Fernando)
 "Aaley Mage" – Mohideen Baig
 "Ai Kare Yamak Aley" – W. D. Albert Perera (Pandith W.D. Amaradewa, lyrics by D.T. Fernando)
 "Jale Mey Dane" – Bhagratathi
 "Nayana Wani Sudo" – Mohideen Baig and Bhagyarathi (lyrics by D.T. Fernando)
 "Aloke Dey" – Bhagyarathi (lyrics by D.T. Fernando)
 "Suduwa Jaya Sri" – Mohideen Baig and chorus

References

External links
 Sri Lanka Cinema Database

1947 films
Films set in the Anuradhapura period
Sri Lankan historical films
1940s historical films
Sri Lankan black-and-white films